Aroa River may refer to:

 Aroa River (Venezuela)
 Aroa River (Papua New Guinea)

See also 
 Aroa (disambiguation)